The 2006 Oregon State Beavers baseball team represented Oregon State University in the 2006 NCAA Division I baseball season. The Beavers played their home games at Goss Stadium. The team was coached by Pat Casey in his 12th season at Oregon State.

The Beavers won the College World Series, defeating the North Carolina Tar Heels in the championship series.

Roster

Schedule

Regular season

Post-season

Awards and honors 
Darwin Barney
All-Pac-10
Dallas Buck
All America Second Team
All-Pac-10
Kevin Gunderson
College World Series All-Tournament Team 
All America Second Team 
All-Pac-10
Cole Gillespie
College World Series All-Tournament Team 
All America First Team
All-Pac-10
Shea McFeely
College World Series All-Tournament Team
Jonah Nickerson
College World Series Most Outstanding Player 
All America Second Team 
All-Pac-10
Bill Rowe
College World Series All-Tournament Team

2006 Major League Baseball draft
The following members of the Oregon State Beavers baseball program were drafted in the 2006 Major League Baseball Draft.

References

Oregon State
Oregon State Beavers baseball seasons
College World Series seasons
NCAA Division I Baseball Championship seasons
Pac-12 Conference baseball champion seasons
2006 in sports in Oregon
Oregon State